Fashchivka may refer to the following places in Ukraine:

Fashchivka, Alchevsk Raion, Luhansk Oblast
Fashchivka, Antratsyt Raion, Luhansk Oblast
Fashchivka, Ternopil Oblast